Václav Kacl (born 29 July 1910; date of death unknown) was a diver who competed for Czechoslovakia. He competed at the 1936 Summer Olympics in Berlin, where he placed 19th in 10 metre platform.

References

External links 
 

1910 births
Year of death missing
Czech male divers
Olympic divers of Czechoslovakia
Divers at the 1936 Summer Olympics